Broad Green is a small residential and retail area between Croydon and Thornton Heath in the London Borough of Croydon. The area was centred on a triangular green space bounded by shops and houses, which was developed at the end of the 19th century. The main landmark of the area, the Safari Cinema, was demolished in 2005.

Most of West Croydon is in Broad Green electoral ward, hence Broad Green library is some distance from the traditional Broad Green area.

See also 
Broad Green (ward)

References

Districts of the London Borough of Croydon
Areas of London